Wacław Andrzej Martyniuk (pronounced ; born 10 November 1949 in Bytom) is a Polish politician. He was elected to Sejm on 25 September 2005, receiving 11,339 votes in the 29th Gliwice district, running on the Democratic Left Alliance (SLD) list.

He was also a member of Sejm 1991-1993, Sejm 1993-1997, Sejm 1997-2001, and Sejm 2001-2005.

See also
Members of Polish Sejm 2005-2007

References

External links
Wacław Martyniuk - parliamentary page - includes declarations of interest, voting record, and transcripts of speeches.

People from Bytom
Members of the Polish Sejm 2005–2007
Members of the Polish Sejm 1991–1993
Members of the Polish Sejm 1993–1997
Members of the Polish Sejm 1997–2001
Members of the Polish Sejm 2001–2005
Democratic Left Alliance politicians
1949 births
Living people
Members of the Polish Sejm 2007–2011